Zoila friendii is a species of sea snail, a cowry, a marine gastropod mollusk in the family Cypraeidae, the cowries.

Subspecies
The following subspecies have been recognized :
 Zoila friendii friendii (J. E. Gray, 1831) (synonyms : Zoila scotti Broderip, W.J., 1831 Cypraea scottii Broderip, 1831 )
 Zoila friendii kostini Lorenz & Chiapponi, 2007
 Zoila friendii marina Kostin, 2005
 Zoila friendii vercoi F. Schilder, 1930

Description

Distribution

This species is distributed along Western Australia.

References

 Lorenz F. (2001) Monograph of the living Zoila. Hackenheim: Conchbooks. 187 pp

External links

Cypraeidae
Gastropods of Australia
Gastropods described in 1831
Taxa named by John Edward Gray